South Dallas is an area in Dallas, Texas. It is south of Downtown Dallas, bordered by Trinity River on the west, Interstate 30 on the north, and the Great Trinity Forest to the south and east. In recent years the City of Dallas and organizations including Dallas Area Habitat for Humanity and Rebuilding Together Dallas have begun revitalizing the area in an effort to make the area more attractive to homeowners and foster economic development. This includes high schools- Lincoln High School and James Madison High School.

Neighborhoods 
The following neighborhoods are generally considered part of or closely connected with South Dallas; some of them may not be located entirely within South Dallas or may be considered parts of South Dallas by some and not others. Some are official subdivisions and some have been named by neighborhood associations.

 Bonton
 Dixon Circle
 Dolphin Heights
 Dunn Park
 Frazier Court
 Jubilee Park, Dallas Jubilee Park
 Owenwood
 Queen City, Texas|Queen City
 Rose Garden, Texas|Rose Garden
 St. Phillips
 South Boulevard & Park Row Historic District
 Turner Courts
 Wheatley Place

Economy and infrastructure
The United States Postal Service operates the South Dallas Post Office.

In 2001, the City of Dallas approved an economic development plan to help revitalize South Dallas and the Fair Park area, both of which suffer from a comparatively high level of poverty.

Education

Primary and secondary schools 
South Dallas is a geographic area within the Dallas Independent School District. The section is served by the following schools:

Elementary schools (multiple campuses)
Charles Rice Learning Center, located in the Queen City area of South Dallas in a red brick, two-story building.
In 2015 Eric Nicholson of the Dallas Observer stated that Rice is "generally regarded by parents as" the best elementary school in South Dallas. According to Nicholson, "regard Charles Rice as a local gem, but its reputation for quality doesn't extend much further than that" partly due to the school's high level of student poverty and partly due to the poor reputation of South Dallas. The school, which as of 2015 had 98% of its students designated as having free or reduced lunch (a marker of being poor), had the highest 2013-2015 School Effectiveness Index (SEI), an internal DISD school index that determines how well a school is performing relative to its community demographics. Nicholson wrote in March 2016 that the SEI ranking "perennially puts Charles Rice neck and neck with [Lakewood Elementary in the Lakewood neighborhood in East Dallas] as the district's best non-magnet school" even though Rice's raw test scores, while above the DISD average, were far below Lakewood's.  Rice had earned three of five distinctions from the Texas Education Agency (TEA). While many low income schools have a lot of teacher turnover, Rice, as of 2016, has an average teacher tenure of 23.3 years.

Middle schools
Billy Earl Dade
The school merged with Pearl C. Anderson Middle School, and opened in a new $36 million building in August 2013. In 2015 Nicholson stated that the combination of the two hostile student populations and poor administration from DISD's central office caused it to become, for a period, "Dallas' Worst Public School". As of 2018, Joseph J. Rhoads Learning Center (PK-5) and Charles Rice Elementary School (PK-5) feed into Dade then into Lincoln. Because Dade MS is the only middle school in near south Dallas, it feeds both Lincoln and James Madison high schools. The students that come to Dade from Paul L. Dunbar Elementary School (PK-5), Martin Luther King, Jr. Learning Center (PK-5), and Oran M. Roberts Elementary School (PK-5) attend high school at Madison.
Kennedy-Curry
Located in far south Dallas and feeds Wilmer Hutchins High School, originally part of the now defunct Wilmer-Hutchins ISD, located south of I-20.

High schools
James Madison High School 
Lincoln High School

Higher Education 
The Bill J. Priest Institute for Economic Development, a campus of El Centro College of the Dallas County Community College District, is located in a brick campus in Old South Dallas. Jim Schutze of the Dallas Observer described the building as "handsome."

Transportation 
Several thoroughfares, DART bus service, and DART light rail exist in South Dallas.

Buses
DART

Light rail

MLK, Jr. Station - Park and Ride
Hatcher Station

Highways 

  Interstate 45
  U.S. Highway 175
  State Highway 310
  State Highway 352

References

External links
 Opinion: Bridging Dallas' North-South Gap - The Dallas Morning News